The 1990–1991 Highland Football League was won by Ross County.

Table

Highland Football League seasons
4